Marc Roberts (born September 20, 1959) is an American entrepreneur, real estate developer and businessman.  He is the first person to take a sports management company public in the United States.

Biography
Born in Newark, New Jersey, Roberts grew up in West Orange, New Jersey and graduated in 1980 from American University where he played basketball. After his coach banned sports agents from trying to recruit his teammate, Russell Bowers, Roberts became his agent; and subsequently dropped out of college.

Roberts was the youngest person to promote a professional boxing match. By the age of 21, he had his first World Champion, Donald Curry, and was working closely with boxing trainer and manager Emanuel Steward.  Roberts went on to manage boxers Ray Mercer and Shannon Briggs.

By his 28th birthday, Roberts had taken his first Sports Management Company, Triple Threat Enterprises public .   In his mid‐30s, he took a second company public, Worldwide Entertainment & Sports Corporation, the first full‐service sports management company to be listed on  NASDAQ. The combined raise for both companies was in excess of $100 million.  
    
While in his 20s, Roberts developed an interest in real estate and started investing in small projects. In 2000, he moved to Florida where he concentrated on residential real estate. A short few years later, Roberts had completed over $1 billion in condominium conversion projects around the country and was a partner in Sunvest, a condominium conversion company. Roberts'other investments include oceanfront properties in Florida (Singer Island, Fort Lauderdale, South Beach, several intracoastal properties in Palm Beach County) and a 32‐story residential building, called the Metropolitan, on the Upper East Side of Manhattan.

Roberts then shifted to commercial properties in Miami by co‐founding Miami Worldcenter, the second largest mixed use development planned in the United States. Marc Roberts Companies became a real estate investment and development firm with upward of $1 billion in investments. Roberts' portfolio includes over 10 acres of property in Miami  contiguous to the Miami Worldcenter Roberts is also a co‐owner of Club E11even, a nightclub and cabaret in Miami.

The Alabama State Legislature proclaimed June 5, 2003 as “Marc Roberts Day” for his contribution to the Easter Seals Camp, ASCCA, . In 2005, Roberts was honored by the Crohn's and Colitis Foundation of America, (the Florida Chapter) by being named Man of the Year. In 2006, Roberts sponsored the Maccabi Youth Games for Metro‐West New Jersey and in 2007 Roberts admitted into the New Jersey Jewish Hall of Fame.

Personal life
Roberts had lived in South Orange, New Jersey and moved to Miami Beach, Florida, where he lives with his wife Marci Lynn (née Mazzotta) and two sons, Ryan and Justin Roberts.

Books

References

1959 births
Living people
Businesspeople from Newark, New Jersey
People from South Orange, New Jersey
People from West Orange, New Jersey
People from Miami Beach, Florida
American business writers
20th-century American Jews
American University alumni
21st-century American Jews